Holjapyx is a genus of diplurans in the family Japygidae.

Species
 Holjapyx calaverasae Smith, 1959
 Holjapyx conspersus Smith, 1959
 Holjapyx diversiunguis (Silvestri, 1911)
 Holjapyx forsteri Pagés, 1952
 Holjapyx humidus Smith, 1959
 Holjapyx hyadis Smith, 1959
 Holjapyx imbutus Smith, 1959
 Holjapyx insiccatus Smith, 1959
 Holjapyx irroratus Smith, 1959
 Holjapyx madidus Smith, 1959
 Holjapyx punamuensis Pagés, 1952
 Holjapyx schusteri Smith, 1959

References

Diplura